The Zimbabwe African National Union (ZANU) was a militant socialist organisation that fought against white-minority rule in Rhodesia, formed as a split from the Zimbabwe African People's Union (ZAPU) in 1963. ZANU split in 1975 into wings loyal to Robert Mugabe and Ndabaningi Sithole, later respectively called ZANU–PF and ZANU–Ndonga. These two sub-divisions ran separately at the 1980 general election, where ZANU–PF has been in power ever since, and ZANU–Ndonga a minor opposition party.

Formation 
ZANU was formed 8 August 1963 when Ndabaningi Sithole, Henry Hamadziripi, Mukudzei Midzi, Herbert Chitepo, Edgar Tekere and Leopold Takawira decided to split from ZAPU at the house of Enos Nkala in Highfield, Salisbury. The founders were dissatisfied with the militant tactics of Nkomo. In contrast to future developments, both parties drew from both the Shona and the Ndebele, the two major tribes of the country. Both ZANU and ZAPU formed political wings within the country (under those names) and military wings: the Zimbabwe African National Liberation Army (ZANLA) and the Zimbabwe People's Revolutionary Army (ZIPRA) respectively to fight the struggle from neighbouring countries – ZANLA from Mozambique and Zambia, and ZIPRA from Zambia and Botswana.

Operations in exile 
Most of ZANU's operations were planned from exile, where the party leadership was based throughout the 1970s, when the party had offices in Lusaka, Dar-es-Salaam, Maputo and London.

Relationship with armed wing 
The Zimbabwe African National Liberation Army (ZANLA) was ZANU's military wing. Before 1980, it was very heavily dependent on China and other communist countries for finance, arms supplies and training. For this reason, ZANU made itself amenable to Mao Zedong Thought and other communist ideology.

Leadership and splits 
There were two splits within ZANU prior to independence. The first was with Nathan Shamuyarira and others leaving to join the Front for the Liberation of Zimbabwe (FROLIZI) in 1973 after Shamuyarira's bid for the party leadership was defeated by Chitepo.

Following the assassination of Chitepo on 18 March 1975, Sithole assumed leadership of the party, but faced immediate opposition from the more militant wing of ZANU, as Sithole was a proponent of détente. This crisis grew with the Mgagao Declaration, where ZANLA leaders and guerillas declared their opposition to Sithole, and led to the effective split of ZANU into a group led by Sithole, who renounced violent struggle, and the group led by Robert Mugabe and Simon Muzenda, with the support of ZANLA, who continued the murder and intimidation of farmers. Both groups continued to use the name ZANU. The Mugabe faction formed the Patriotic Front with ZAPU in 1976, and became known as ZANU-PF. Sithole's faction, dubbed "ZANU Mwenje" or "ZANU Sithole", joined a transitional government of whites and blacks in 1979, led by Bishop Abel Muzorewa. When sanctions remained in place, he joined Muzorewa for the Lancaster House Agreement in London, where a new constitution and elections were prepared.

Zimbabwe independence 
At the 1980 general election to the newly constituted state of Zimbabwe, ZANU–PF (registered as such) won a majority with ZAPU (registered as PF–ZAPU) in second place. ZAPU merged into ZANU–PF in 1987. Sithole's group (registered as ZANU) failed to win any seats in 1980. Later it won a few seats and was renamed ZANU-Ndonga; it remains a minor party with support among the Ndau.

See also
Politics of Zimbabwe
Rhodesian propaganda war
Zimbabwe African Peoples Union (ZAPU)

References

ZANU–PF
Defunct political parties in Zimbabwe
Political parties in Rhodesia
History of Zimbabwe
Guerrilla organizations
Political parties disestablished in 1987
Rebel groups in Zimbabwe
African and Black nationalist organizations in Africa
National liberation movements
National liberation armies
African resistance to colonialism
Organizations formerly designated as terrorist
1963 establishments in Southern Rhodesia
1987 disestablishments in Zimbabwe